Ishtarat was a Semitic deity worshipped in the city of Mari, Syria. Her temple was found in 1952.

Ishtarat was most probably a variant of Ishtar, who was worshipped beside Ishtarat in Mari.

References

Citations

Sources

Fertility goddesses
Levantine mythology
Love and lust goddesses
West Semitic goddesses
Inanna
Mari, Syria